Al-watan, meaning homeland, heimat, country, or nation, may refer to:

Politics
Al-Watan means 'national' in Arabic and in Persian (وطن), the articles titles on Wikipedia for political parties are sometimes translated as 'national', sometimes as 'al-watan', 'al-watani' or 'watani'. Wataniyya may also refer to State-based ('patriotic') nationalism (see Egyptian nationalism), as opposed to Qawmiyya, ethnic-based Arab nationalism
 Al-Watani Party, a former Egyptian party
 Al-Watan Party, a Libyan party
 Al-Watani Party, a former Syrian party
 Al-Watan Party, a centrist party in Tunisia
 Watan Party of Afghanistan, an Afghan political party
 Vatan Party, a former Iranian party
 Vatan Partisi, a Turkish party

Songs
"Ardulfurataini Watan", the former national anthem of Iraq
"Nahnu Jund Allah Jund Al-watan", the national anthem of Sudan
"Rasamna Ala Al-Qalb Wajh Al-Watan", the Army anthem of Egypt
"Al Watan Al Akbar", a Pan Arabist nationalist song was composed to celebrate the union of Egypt and Syria into the United Arab Republic

Publications
It is commonly used as the name of Arabic-language newspapers, as well as newspapers in other languages that have borrowed the word:

 Al-Watan (Bahrain), an Arabic daily newspaper published in Bahrain
 Watan News, online Jordanian news agency
 Al-Watan (Kuwait), a Kuwaiti Arabic-language defunct daily published by the Al Watan publishing house
 Al-Watan Daily, a daily English-language newspaper published in Kuwait
 Alwatan (Oman), an Arabic daily newspaper published in Oman
 Al Watan (Palestine), a Hamas-owned newspaper shut down by Palestinian authorities in 1996
 Al-Watan (Qatar), a daily morning Arabic-language political newspaper based in Doha, Qatar
 Al-Watan (Saudi Arabia), a daily newspaper in Saudi Arabia
 Al-Watan (Syria), an Arabic-language daily newspaper published in Syria
 Al-Watwan (Comoros), a Comorian French-language and Comorian Arabic-language daily newspaper published in Moroni, Comoros

 El Watan, an Algerian newspaper
 Nawai Watan, a Balochi newspaper in Pakistan
 Vatan, a Turkish newspaper

Places
Al-Watan, San‘a’, a village in western central Yemen

Other uses
 Watan (film), a 1938 Indian film
Watan Group, a telecommunications and security company in Afghanistan
Pader Watan, a military unit in the Soviet-backed Democratic Republic of Afghanistan
Watan Order, the highest national order of Turkmenistan
Watan, a historical land allotment in India owned by a Watandar
 Ardulfurataini, national anthem of Iraq from 1981 to 2003

ar:الوطن